Similarity transformation may refer to:

 Similarity (geometry), for shape-preserving transformations
 Matrix similarity, for matrix transformations of the form

See also
 Similarity (disambiguation)
 Transformation (disambiguation)
 Affine transformation